Vaga may refer to :

Organizations and Businesses
 VAGA, an artists' rights organization and copyright collective
, book publisher, Lithuania
Places and jurisdictions
 Vaga (Tunisia), an ancient city and former bishopric in Tunisia, nos the city of Béja and a Latin Catholic titular see
 Vaga (river), a river in Russia
 Vaga (inhabited locality), several inhabited localities in Russia
 Vågå, a municipality in Norway
 Vágar Municipality on the Faroe Islands (Vága kommuna, in Faroese language)
 Vågå Church, a stave church in Norway
 Vaga, Morovis, Puerto Rico, a barrio

People
 August Vaga (1893–1960), Estonian botanist
 Perino del Vaga (1501–1547), Italian painter

Other
 Vaga, described by Zimmerman in 1958, a gossamer-winged butterfly genus usually included in Udara today
 Vaga (brachiopod), a brachiopod genus described in 1973

See also 
 Våga (disambiguation)
 Vága (disambiguation)